Leon Anthony Williams (born 25 July 1991) is a Dutch professional basketball player who plays for Donar of the BNXT League. He is a current member of the Dutch national basketball team.

Professional career
Williams started his career in Bergen op Zoom, with WCAA Giants. The season after that, he played for Rotterdam Basketbal College. In 2012, he signed with Landstede Basketbal from Zwolle. In 2013, he received the DBL Most Improved Player award. He was an DBL All-Star starter in the 2013–14 season. He also received the MVP U23 Award after the regular season.

In the 2015 offseason, Williams signed a three-year deal with SPM Shoeters Den Bosch.

On 23 June 2016, Williams signed with BG Göttingen for the 2016–17 season. Williams re-signed with Göttingen after the season. He parted ways with the team on May 23, 2018, after averaging 5.5 points per game.

On 2 September 2018, Williams signed a one-year contract with TAU Castelló of the Spanish LEB Oro.

On 25 June 2019, Williams has signed 2-year contract with Donar of the Dutch Basketball League.

On 14 May 2020, Williams signed a temporary contract with BG Göttingen of the German league. The Dutch League season had finished due to the COVID-19 pandemic.

In the 2020–21 season, Williams was named to the DBL All-Defense Team.

Honours
Donar
Dutch Basketball Cup: 2021–22
Den Bosch
Dutch Basketball Supercup (1): 2015

Individual awards

DBL Most Improved Player (1): 2012–13
DBL All-Star (3): 2014, 2015, 2016
DBL MVP Under 23 (1): 2013–14
DBL All-Defense Team: 2020–21

Dutch national team
In 2013, Williams was selected for the Dutch national basketball team by head coach Toon van Helfteren. He played as back-up point guard at the FIBA EuroBasket 2015 qualification. He averaged 5.0 points in 2 games.

References

External links

 eurobasket.com profile

1991 births
Living people
AB Castelló players
BG Göttingen players
Den Helder Suns players
Donar (basketball club) players
Dutch Basketball League players
Dutch expatriate basketball people in Germany
Dutch expatriate basketball people in Spain
Dutch men's basketball players
Feyenoord Basketball players
Guards (basketball)
Landstede Hammers players
Sportspeople from Amersfoort
West-Brabant Giants players